Mesalands Community College, is a public community college in Tucumcari, New Mexico. It is also the home of the North American Wind Research and Training Center and the Mesalands Stampede Intercollegiate Rodeo Team.

Originally known as Tucumcari Area Vocational School, it was established in 1979.

Collaboration with Sandia National Laboratories
On April 14, 2009, Mesalands Community College and Sandia National Laboratories signed a memorandum of understanding allowing the college's North American Wind Research and Training Center and the lab to collaborate on such projects as turbine operations and maintenance, reliability of turbine components, and repair methods. It is the first memo of its kind between a national laboratory and a two-year college.

Gallery

References

External links
 Official website

1979 establishments in New Mexico
Buildings and structures in Quay County, New Mexico
Community colleges in New Mexico
Education in Quay County, New Mexico
Educational institutions established in 1979
Tucumcari, New Mexico